XHIB-FM is a radio station in Caborca, Sonora, Mexico. Broadcasting on 89.9 FM, XHIB is owned by Radiovisa and known as La Que Manda.

History
XEIB-AM received its concession on March 27, 1989. It was owned by María Esther Núñez Herrera and operated as a 250-watt daytimer on 1170 kHz, with power later raised to 1,000 watts.

XEIB was cleared to move to FM in 2011.

References

1989 establishments in Mexico
Radio stations established in 1989
Radio stations in Sonora
Regional Mexican radio stations
Spanish-language radio stations